Skulls Unlimited International, Inc. is a commercial supplier of osteological specimens located in Oklahoma City, Oklahoma.  Skulls Unlimited Inc. provides a skull cleaning service, using dermestid beetles to strip the flesh from skulls and skeletons. The bones are later whitened using hydrogen peroxide. Skulls Unlimited processes approximately 25,000 skull specimens per year.

History
In the summer of 1986, Jay Villemarette found himself out of work after being laid off from his auto body job and started considering the possibility of working full-time with skulls. In June of that year he established Skulls Unlimited International Inc. His fascination with skulls and bones began when he was seven years old, after he found a dog skull in the woods near his home. That interest, along with encouragement from his father, led Villemarette to begin collecting other animal skulls. After graduating from high school, he collected and sold skulls in his spare time while working as an auto body technician. As sales grew, Villemarette and his wife Kim began to clean skulls in their kitchen.

After relocating to a retail location for his business in 1992, Villemarette was able to employ his first full-time employees. Skulls Unlimited Inc. remained at their South Shields address until June 2000, when they expanded into a custom built facility in Oklahoma City.

Over the years this business has been featured on several television programs including;
 Taboo; "Living with the Dead" Season 8, Episode 5. Air Date: June 17, 2012
 Auction Kings; "Les Paul Guitar/Giant Bat" Season 3, Episode 12. Air Date: Jun.14, 2012
 Modern Marvels; "Built by Hand" Season 18, Episode 2. Air Date: Oct. 10, 2011
 Skeleton, Inc. Season 1, Episode 1 (Pilot). Air Date: Sept. 18, 2011
 Weird, True & Freaky; "Eternally Stuffed" Season 3, Episode    12. Air Date: Nov. 23, 2010
 Dirty Jobs; "Skull Cleaner" Season 1, Episode 23. Air Date: July 11, 2006
 MSNBC Investigates; "Shades of Obsession" Season 1, Episode 115. Air Date: April 17, 2001
 Ripley's Believe It or Not! Season 2, Episode 6. Air Date: Feb. 14, 2001

In 2004, Skulls Unlimited Inc. was invited to participate in the Discovery Channel's Young Scientists Challenge in Washington D.C. This televised event was hosted by the Mythbusters, Adam Savage and Jamie Hyneman.
 
In January 2013, Villemarette guest starred on John Hodgman's podcast Judge John Hodgman as an "expert witness" to comment on the hobby of collecting skeletons and taxidermied animals.

Museum of Osteology
In 2004, Skulls Unlimited Inc. started construction on a new  building that now houses Skulls Unlimited Inc.'s corporate offices and The Museum of Osteology. The museum opened to the public on October 1, 2010 and exhibits over 300 real skeletons and over 400 real skulls, focusing on the form and function of the skeletal system. On May 1, 2015, Skulls Unlimited Inc. opened a second museum, SKELETONS: Museum of Osteology, in Orlando, FL., which displays over 500 real skeletons.

References

External links
Official site

Companies based in Oklahoma City
American companies established in 1986
1986 establishments in Oklahoma